There are two major series of highways in Dubai, which are "E" and "D". These are further divided into several major and minor inter-city and intra-city roads. The network of highways and roads in Dubai, United Arab Emirates are managed by the Roads and Transport Authority (RTA)

These are the list of routes in Dubai, United Arab Emirates.

See also
 Dubai route numbering system

References
 Gulfnews.com
 Dubai Faqs.com
 Gulfnews.com Dubai's road signs

 

Dubai
Roads